The 2001 Energis Open tennis tournament was played in Amsterdam, Netherlands in July 2001.

Magnus Gustafsson was the defending singles champion but lost in the semifinals to Younes El Aynaoui.

Àlex Corretja won in the final 6–3, 5–7, 7–6(7–0), 3–6, 6–4 against El Aynaoui.

Seeds

Draw

Finals

Section 1

Section 2

References
 2001 Energis Open Draw

Dutch Open (tennis)
2001 ATP Tour
2001 Dutch Open (tennis)